Thisizima sedilis is a moth of the family Tineidae. It is found in Bhutan, Sikkim, Burma and Thailand.

References

External links 

Moths described in 1907
Tineidae